Luigi Ricci may refer to:

 Luigi Ricci (composer) (1805–1859), Italian composer
 Luigi Ricci (vocal coach) (1893–1981), Italian assistant conductor and vocal coach
 Gino Ricci (1910-?), Italian javelin thrower